Park Su-jin (born 4 June 1999) is a South Korean swimmer. She competed in the women's 200 metre butterfly at the 2019 World Aquatics Championships.

References

External links
 

1999 births
Living people
South Korean female butterfly swimmers
Place of birth missing (living people)